Novosaratovka (also, Novaya Saratovka) is a village, municipality and minor transport hub in the Gadabay Rayon of Azerbaijan.  It has a population of 2,328. Though it's probably older, the current settlement was originally founded in the 1830s by Russians of the Doukhobor sect, one of several Old Believer villages in the area including nearby Novoivanovka and Gorelsk (now Daşbulaq).

History
According to grave inscriptions, the first recorded Russian settler was a certain Batayev, who arrived in 1837. During the 1840s and 1850s, Novosaratovka attracted a steady influx of immigrants from Russia, especially from the Balashovsky District of Saratov. Many of them, being serfs or being recruited, did not officially have the right to travel to the Transcaucasus and therefore lived essentially as fugitives, often changing their names to disguise their backgrounds.

Monuments
In 2017, a bust of Colonel Jahangir Rustamov (1939-1994) was erected in front of the military headquarters in the village, commemorating the former-Soviet leader who led the counterattack that reclaimed Mutudərə from Armenian occupation in 1992.

Notable natives 

 Ivan Bogdanov — Hero of the Soviet Union.

References 

Populated places in Gadabay District